United Kingdom Independent Broadcasting (UKIB) is an affiliation of three British independent television production companies and broadcasters. The primary function of its predecessor, the Independent Television Companies Association (ITCA), was to represent independent British television interests as a member of the European Broadcasting Union (EBU). The current members of UKIB are the ITV network centre, the 4 ITV licence holders, Channel 4, and S4C.

History 

UKIB was formed in 1981, when the Association of Independent Radio Contractors (AIRC) was admitted as an active member of the European Broadcasting Union (EBU). It replaced the Independent Broadcasting Authority (IBA), formerly the Independent Television Authority (ITA) as the second British EBU member.
 
Once ITCA was admitted as a fully active EBU member, the AIRC joined with UKIB to form the Commercial Radio Companies Association (CRCA) in June 1996. In July 2006, it merged with the Radio Advertising Bureau to form Radiocentre, the industry body for UK commercial radio. Following the merger, CRCA cancelled its EBU membership.

The IBA continued to exist until it was disbanded by the Broadcasting Act 1990, which replaced it with the Independent Television Commission (ITC) and the Radio Authority.

Members

Digital channels 
Besides the main ITV, Channel 4, and S4C channels, there are several digital-only channels (ITV2, ITV3, ITV4, CITV and ITVBe) owned by ITV plc and E4, More4, Film4, 4seven and 4Music operated by Channel 4.

Eurovision Song Contest 
The 's entries in the Eurovision Song Contest have been entered by the BBC each time. ITV were also set to host the  contest in Manchester, but pulled out of hosting due to financial and scheduling issues, as well as the previous years poor viewing figures. The contest was eventually held in Lillehammer, Norway.

S4C announced on 9 May 2018 that  would debut at the Junior Eurovision Song Contest 2018 held in Minsk, Belarus.

Notes and references

Footnotes

References

External links 
 ITV
 STV
 UTV
 Channel 4
 S4C English
 S4C Welsh

Television organisations in the United Kingdom
ITV (TV network)
Channel 4
European Broadcasting Union members
1981 establishments in the United Kingdom
Organizations established in 1981